Emil Schorsch (born January 12, 1899 in Hüngheim, Germany; died 1982 in Vineland (New Jersey)) was a German Rabbi.

Life 
Emil was the son of businessman Isaak Schorsch. In 1907 he was placed in an orphanage, and from 1915 to 1920 he trained to be a teacher, with an interruption for war service.

Schorsch began to study philosophy, psychology, and oriental languages in 1922 at the Universities of Breslau and Tübingen. He simultaneously studied at the Jewish Theological Seminary of Breslau.  In 1925, he completed his dissertation "Die Lehrbarkeit der Religion" (The Teachability of Religion).

In 1927 Schorsch was called to Hannover to be the second rabbi in the community, along with Samuel Freund. His tasks included working with Jewish youth, and he helped start Jewish school for secondary school students, the Lehrhaus.

Emil Schorsch was married to Fanny Rothschild (1901-1983), a daughter of Theodore Rothschild. Their children were Hanna Schorsch and  Ismar Schorsch, who became a rabbi and was the president of the Leo Baeck Institute (LBI) New York and Chancellor of the Jewish Theological Seminary of America.

During the Kristallnacht in 1938, Emil was arrested and interned at the Buchenwald concentration camp.  After his release, he and his family fled first to England, and in 1940 to the USA.  He was a rabbi in Pottstown, Pennsylvania, from 1940 to 1964.

Works 
 Die Lehrbarkeit der Religion (1925, Dissertation)

Literature 
 Ismar Schorsch: Rabbi Emil Schorsch za"l, 1982
 Guido Kisch: Das Breslauer Seminar. Jüdisch-Theologisches Seminar (Fraenkelsche Stiftung) in Breslau 1854–1939; Gedächtnisschrift, Tübingen 1963; p. 433
 Biographisches Handbuch der deutschsprachigen Emigration nach 1933, hg. von W. Röder und H. Strauss. München, 1980; p. 666
 Monika Richarz (Editor): Jüdisches Leben in Deutschland; Bd. 3: Selbstzeugnisse zur Sozialgeschichte 1918–1945; 1982; p. 183–188

External links 
The Leo Baeck Institute, New York, holds two archival collections relating to Emil Schorsch, AR 25446 and AR 25103.

References

1899 births
1982 deaths
20th-century German rabbis

Jewish emigrants from Nazi Germany to the United States
Buchenwald concentration camp survivors